Karen Twehues (born 16 December 1983 in Minusio, Switzerland) is a Swiss female basketball player  who plays as Shooting guard.

References

External links
Profile at eurobasket.com

1983 births
Living people
People from Minusio
Swiss women's basketball players
Shooting guards
Swiss expatriate basketball people in Italy